Boudet Island is the largest of several small islands lying off the south end of Petermann Island, in the Wilhelm Archipelago. It was discovered by the French Antarctic Expedition, 1908–10, and named by J.B. Charcot, probably for Monsieur Boudet, then French Consul in Brazil.

See also 
 List of Antarctic and sub-Antarctic islands

References
 

Islands of the Wilhelm Archipelago